Jano Ananidze (born 10 October 1992) is a Georgian former professional footballer who played as a midfielder.

Club career

Spartak Moscow
Ananidze appeared in Spartak Moscow colours in spring of 2009, initially playing for its junior's team, scoring four goals in twelve games. During the midseason break Valery Karpin moved Ananidze from juniors into the main team, then on a training tour in Austria. Ananidze debuted in Russian Cup on 15 July 2009, scoring a goal against first division Krasnodar. On 1 August 2009, Ananidze debuted in regular Russian Premier League 2009 championship, substituting Alex in the 69th minute of the game.

On 18 October 2009, he became the youngest player ever to score a goal in the Russian Premier League (he scored for Spartak Moscow against Lokomotiv Moscow when he was 17 years and 8 days old).

After a successful ending of his debut season, Jano was on the radar of Arsenal, Milan and Juventus. Spartak Moscow sporting director Dmitri Popov insisted the club would not listen to offers until Ananidze was at least in his 20s.

In September 2012, before the 2014 World Cup qualification match against Spain, Iker Casillas named Ananidze as one of the key players of the Georgia national football team alongside the keeper Giorgi Loria.

On 21 January 2020, his contract with Spartak was terminated by mutual consent, 13 years after he originally joined the club's academy.

FC Rostov
On 3 July 2013, he went on a one-year loan to FC Rostov.

Krylia Sovetov Samara
On 13 January 2019, he joined Krylia Sovetov Samara on loan until the end of the 2018–19 season.

Rotor Volgograd
On 6 August 2020, he returned to Russian Premier League and signed with Rotor Volgograd. His Rotor contract was terminated by mutual consent on 12 September 2020 due to a knee injury.

Dinamo Tbilisi
In April 2021, Ananidze returned to his native Georgia, joining Dinamo Tbilisi.

In April 2022, Jano announced his retirement ended his career due to multiple injuries. For the last three months he played in FC Dynamo Batumi and during this period he appeared on the field for only 122 minutes in total.

International career
In March 2009 UEFA web site listed Ananidze as one of three "key players" of Georgian U-17 team along with Nika Dzalamidze and Irakli Shekiladze. In July 2009 Ananidze received and accepted Héctor Cúper's invitation into Georgian national team. Ananidze told Russian media "don't worry about me. I made my choice. I am a Georgian and I will play for my country.".

He made his debut for Georgia in a 2–0 home defeat by Italy on 5 September 2009. He scored his first goal against Slovenia in Koper on 17 November 2010. Then he scored against Moldova from the penalty spot and Georgia won this match 2–0 on 11 November 2011.

Career statistics

Club

International
Scores and results list Georgia's goal tally first, score column indicates score after each Ananidze goal.

Honours
Spartak Moscow
Russian Premier League: 2016–17
Russian Super Cup: 2017

Rostov
 Russian Cup: 2013–14

Dinamo Batumi
 Georgian Super Cup: 2022

References

External links
 Player profile at Spartak official web-site 
 
 
 

1992 births
Living people
People from Kobuleti
Footballers from Georgia (country)
Association football midfielders
Georgia (country) international footballers
Georgia (country) youth international footballers
Georgia (country) under-21 international footballers
FC Spartak Moscow players
FC Rostov players
PFC Krylia Sovetov Samara players
Anorthosis Famagusta F.C. players
FC Rotor Volgograd players
FC Dinamo Tbilisi players
FC Dinamo Batumi players
Russian Premier League players
Cypriot First Division players
Georgian people of Russian descent
Expatriate footballers from Georgia (country)
Expatriate footballers in Ukraine
Expatriate sportspeople from Georgia (country) in Ukraine
Expatriate footballers in Russia
Expatriate sportspeople from Georgia (country) in Russia
Expatriate footballers in Cyprus
Expatriate sportspeople from Georgia (country) in Cyprus